Igor Ivanovich Rakovskiy (born 10 September 1975) is a former Russian football player.

Club career
He made his professional debut in the Russian Second Division for FC Chkalovets-1936 Novosibirsk on 3 July 2003 in a game against FC Selenga Ulan-Ude.

References

External links
 

1975 births
Living people
Russian footballers
Association football midfielders
Russian expatriate footballers
Expatriate footballers in Belarus
FC Sibir Novosibirsk players
FC Slavia Mozyr players
FC Rechitsa-2014 players
Belarusian Premier League players